"Beyond the Realms of Death" is a power ballad by English heavy metal band Judas Priest from their 1978 album Stained Class. The song is considered a Judas Priest classic by fans and critics, with further recordings included in Priest, Live and Rare, '98 Live Meltdown, Live in London, A Touch of Evil: Live, Live Insurrection and a number of compilation albums. Drummer Les Binks has his only songwriting credit with the band for the main riff.

Composition
The song is written in B-minor, employing a verse-chorus structure, interspersed with a solo following the first and second chorus by Glenn Tipton and K. K. Downing respectively. The verses use an acoustic riff, while the choruses and outro are more typical of the band's heavy metal sound.

The lyrics depict a man waiting for death as he suffers from catatonia or depression. Though the manner of his death is unclear, it is implied to be by suicide.

The song was mentioned in a 1990 trial in which the parents of two teens who had committed suicide after listening to Stained Class alleged that subliminal messages encouraging suicide had been hidden in another song on the album. In a telephone interview with The New York Times at the time, Halford confirmed that the song carries an anti-suicidal message, discussing how people suffering from depression withdraw from society and refuse to communicate.

Covers
Blind Guardian covered of the song for their album A Tribute to Judas Priest: Legends of Metal Vol. II.

Personnel
 Rob Halford – vocals
 K. K. Downing – guitars
 Glenn Tipton – guitars
 Ian Hill – bass
 Les Binks – drums

References

1977 songs
Heavy metal ballads
Judas Priest songs
Songs about suicide
Songs written by Rob Halford